The 1979 North Bedfordshire Borough Council election took place on 3 May 1979 to elect members of North Bedfordshire Borough Council in England. This was on the same day as the 1979 general election and other local elections.

Summary

Election result

|}

References

Bedford
Bedford Borough Council elections
1970s in Bedfordshire